Thothilath Sibounhuang  is a Laotian footballer who plays as a defender. player Bolikhamxay in Lao League 1 He captained the Laos national football team at the 2017 CTFA International Tournament.

References 

Living people
1990 births
Laotian footballers
Laos international footballers
Association football defenders